Karl-Heinz Schäfer (born 3 May 1921) is a German sprint canoeist who competed in the early 1950s. He finished sixth in the K-2 10000 m event at the 1952 Summer Olympics in Helsinki.

References
Sports-reference.com profile

External links
  

1921 births
Canoeists at the 1952 Summer Olympics
German male canoeists
Possibly living people
Olympic canoeists of Germany